The 1916 United States Senate election in Montana took place on November 7, 1916. Incumbent Senator Henry L. Myers was re-elected to a second term in office, defeating Republican Charles N. Pray.

Republican primary

Candidates
John E. Edwards
Charles Nelson Pray, former U.S. Representative

Results

General election

Results

References

Montana
1916
1916 Montana elections